Andrea Wallace (born 22 November 1966) is an English former long-distance runner who represented Great Britain in the 10,000 metres at the 1992 Olympic Games in Barcelona. She also won a silver medal over 15 km at the 1991 IAAF World Women's Road Race Championships in Nieuwegein.

Career
Wallace was born in Northallerton, Yorkshire, England and was a member of Torbay Athletics Club. She emerged as one of the UK's leading distance runners in 1990, winning the UK World Cross-Country trial in Glasgow, before going on to win the UK National 3000 metres title and the AAA Championships National 10,000 metres title on the track.

Having missed the 1990 World Cross Country Championships through injury and then declined selection for the 1990 European Championships, Wallace's first major championships was the 1990 IAAF 15 km World Road Race Championships in Dublin, where she finished a fine fourth, just one second away from a medal. The following year she placed 27th at the 1991 World Cross Country Championships. Then at the 15 km World Road Race Championships in Nieuwegein, she won the silver medal in a best time of 48:43, narrowly losing out to Iulia Negura of Romania but finishing ahead of Uta Pippig of Germany.

In the spring of 1992, Wallace finished third at the London Marathon in 2:31:33. In the summer, she won her second AAAs 10,000 metres title in 32:21.61, to earn Olympic selection. At the Barcelona Olympics however, she struggled, managing to run only 34:29 in her heat, failing to reach the final.

In 1993, Wallace achieved her lifetime best half-marathon performance, running 69:39 in Bath. In 1994, she finished second at the Great North Run Half-Marathon behind Rosanna Munerotto of Italy, having previously finished second in 1991, behind Ingrid Kristiansen.

At her best on the roads, as of 2018, Wallace still ranks in the UK all-time top ten lists for the 15 km and half-marathon. Her 15 km best of 48:43 (Nieuwegein 1991) ranks her sixth and her half-marathon best of 69:39 (Bath 1993) ranks her seventh. Her 10 km road best of 31:56 (Stoke 1991) ranks her 11th.

Achievements
AAAs National 10,000 metres Champion (1990, 1992)
UK National 3000 metres Champion (1990)

Note: At the 1992 World Half Marathon Championships, Wallace won a team silver medal, along with Liz McColgan and Suzanne Rigg.

References

External links

Living people
1966 births
Athletes from Yorkshire
People from Northallerton
English female long-distance runners
British female long-distance runners
British female marathon runners
Olympic athletes of Great Britain
Athletes (track and field) at the 1992 Summer Olympics